Cynanchum gentryi is a species of plant in the family Apocynaceae. It is endemic to Ecuador.  Its natural habitat is equatorial moist lowland forests. It is threatened by habitat loss.

References

gentryi
Endemic flora of Ecuador
Critically endangered flora of South America
Taxonomy articles created by Polbot